In sports and video games, a pick-up game (also known as a scratch game or PUG) is a game that has been spontaneously started by a group of players.  Players are generally invited to show up beforehand, but unlike exhibition games there is no sense of obligation or commitment to play. Pick-up games usually lack officials and referees, which makes them more disorganized and less structured than regular games, but the total number of players in such games globally is likely to be greater than the number playing in formal competitions and leagues. 

Without formal rules and regulations, pick-up games are often played with a less rigid set of rules.

See also
Amateur sports
British bulldog
Corkball
French Cricket
Fuzzball
Indian ball
Sandlot ball
Stickball
Street basketball
Street cricket 
Street football
Street football (American)
Street hockey
Tapeball
Shinny
Shirts versus skins

References

Further reading
 
 

Sports terminology